The 1980 NCAA Division I Men's Soccer Tournament was the 22nd organized men's college soccer tournament by the National Collegiate Athletic Association, to determine the top college soccer team in the United States. The San Francisco Dons won their fourth national title (their 1978 title and tournament wins were vacated by the NCAA) by defeating the Indiana Hoosiers in the championship game, 4–3, after one overtime period. Oddly, this was re-match of the 1978 tournament final won by San Francisco but later vacated by the NCAA. The final match was played on December 14, 1980, in Tampa, Florida, at Tampa Stadium for the third straight year.

Early rounds

Championship Rounds

Third-Place Final

Final

See also  
 1980 NCAA Division II Soccer Championship
 1980 NCAA Division III Soccer Championship
 1980 NAIA Soccer Championship

References 

NCAA Division I Men's Soccer Tournament seasons
NCAA Division I Men's
Sports competitions in Tampa, Florida
NCAA Division I Men's Soccer Tournament
NCAA Division I Men's Soccer Tournament
Soccer in Florida